2 Fast 2 Furious  is a 2003 action film directed by John Singleton from a screenplay by Michael Brandt and Derek Haas, based on a story by Brandt, Haas, and Gary Scott Thompson. It is the sequel to The Fast and the Furious (2001), and is the second installment in the Fast & Furious franchise. The film stars Paul Walker as Brian O'Conner alongside Tyrese Gibson, Eva Mendes, Cole Hauser, Chris "Ludacris" Bridges, and James Remar. In the film, ex-LAPD officer Brian O'Conner and his friend Roman Pearce (Gibson) go undercover for the United States Customs Service and the FBI to apprehend drug lord Carter Verone (Hauser).

A second Fast & Furious film was planned immediately after the theatrical release of its predecessor in 2001, and was confirmed with the returns of Walker and producer Neal H. Moritz. Vin Diesel and Rob Cohen, the co-star and director of the first film, were unable to return; Gibson and Singleton joined the cast in their absence in 2002. To canonically account for Diesel's departure, the short film The Turbo Charged Prelude for 2 Fast 2 Furious (2003) was produced and released. Principal photography for 2 Fast 2 Furious commenced in September 2002 and lasted until that December, with filming locations including Miami and the surrounding areas in southern Florida.

2 Fast 2 Furious premiered at the Universal Amphitheatre in Los Angeles on June 3, 2003, and was theatrically released worldwide by Universal Pictures on June 6. The film received negative reviews from critics on Rotten Tomatoes and Metacritic. 2 Fast 2 Furious grossed over $236 million worldwide, making it the 17th highest-grossing film of 2003 and the then-highest grossing film in the franchise. The standalone sequel film, The Fast and the Furious: Tokyo Drift, was released in 2006.

Plot
Ex-LAPD officer turned fugitive Brian O'Conner makes a living participating in illegal street races organized by his mechanic friend Tej Parker in Miami. After winning a race against drivers including Suki, the police show up and Brian is arrested. He is given a deal by his former boss FBI Agent Bilkins and U.S. Customs Agent Markham to go undercover and bring down Argentinian drug lord Carter Verone in exchange for clearing his criminal record. Brian agrees on the condition that he choose his partner.

Brian heads home to Barstow, California, where he enlists the help of Roman Pearce, a childhood friend who had served jail time and is under parole. Roman agrees, but only for the same deal Brian was offered. In Miami, Agent Monica Fuentes, undercover with Verone for a year, assists them into his organization. After acquiring confiscated vehicles and being hired by Verone as his drivers, the duo returns to a Customs/FBI hideout, where Roman confronts Markham over interference with the mission. Brian informs Bilkins and Markham that Verone plans to smuggle the money into his private jet and fly off.

To evade their GPS traces, Brian and Roman challenge a pair of muscle car drivers they raced earlier for pink slips. Despite engine and power output handicaps, Brian and Roman manage to win the race and the other two cars. Roman confronts Brian about his attraction to Monica and the constant threat of Verone's men, but they patch up their differences. At a nightclub, Brian and Roman witness Verone torturing MPD Detective Whitworth into giving his men a window of opportunity to make their getaway. The next morning, Monica warns them that they will be killed once the drop is made. Despite this, Markham refuses to call off the job, claiming that it is their one chance to catch Verone.

On the day of the mission, Brian and Roman begin transporting duffel bags of Verone's money with two of Verone's men—Enrique and Roberto—riding along to watch them. Before the 15-minute window is set, Whitworth, the detective in charge, decides to call in the police to move in for the arrest, resulting in a high-speed chase across the city. The duo leads the police to a warehouse, where a "scramble" by dozens of street racers organized by Tej disorients the police. Following the scramble, the police manage to pull over the wanted cars, only to find out that they were driven by Tej and Suki.

As Brian approaches the destination point in a Yenko Camaro, Enrique tells him to make a detour away from the airfield to the Tarpon Point Marina exit. Meanwhile, Roman gets rid of Roberto by using an improvised ejector seat in his Dodge Challenger powered by nitrous oxide. At the airfield, Customs Agents have Verone's plane and convoy surrounded, only to discover they have been duped into a decoy maneuver while Verone is at a boatyard miles away. Verone reveals he knew Monica was undercover, and gave her the wrong destination point and plans to use her as leverage. When Brian arrives at the marina, Enrique prepares to kill him; Roman appears and helps incapacitate Enrique. Verone escapes aboard his private yacht, but Brian and Roman drive the Yenko Camaro off a ramp, crashing on top of it. The duo apprehend Verone and save Monica.

As part of the deal, Markham clears Brian and Roman’s criminal record, and in return Roman turns over the second half of Verone's cash. The two agree to stay in Miami, and Brian suggests opening a garage—funded by a cut of Verone's cash Roman kept for themselves.

Cast

Production

Development

Plans to make a sequel came about after the box office success of The Fast and the Furious, which grossed over $200 million worldwide. John Singleton had seen the first film and was awed by it, saying: "When I saw The Fast and the Furious, I was like, 'Damn, why didn't I think of that?' Growing up in South Central L.A., we had street races all the time." Singleton's rave reaction of the film as well as the culture of street racing in general influenced his decision to direct the sequel. The director also claimed that the concept of street racing could be something young audiences can relate to.

The screenplay was written by Michael Brandt and Derek Haas, along with Gary Scott Thompson (the co-writer from the first film). There were two film treatments submitted early on, one of which did not involve Vin Diesel's character in the event the actor would not return for the sequel. Singleton credited Top Gun as a major influence for the film, particularly with regard to the action sequences.

Pre-production

Vin Diesel was offered $25 million to return in the sequel as Dominic Toretto. However, he refused after reading the screenplay as he felt that its potential was inferior compared to that of its predecessor; rather, he chose to appear in The Chronicles of Riddick. According to Variety magazine in 2015 he was less taken with what the screenwriters had in mind for the film, "They didn't take a Francis Ford Coppola approach to it. They approached it like they did sequels in the '80s and '90s, when they would drum up a new story unrelated for the most part, and slap the same name on it." However, Diesel reflected on his decision in a July 2014 report from Uproxx, saying: "I would've said, 'Don't walk away from it just because the script sucked in 2 Fast 2 Furious because there's an obligation to the audience to fight, no matter what, to make that film as good as possible.' ... I might have had a little bit more patience or belief in the long-term of it."

Paul Walker, who had just finished Timeline at the time, reprised his role in the second picture as Brian O'Conner. Tyrese Gibson, then known mononymously as Tyrese, also became a part of the cast having previously acted in Singleton's Baby Boy, which was the singer's feature film acting debut; he portrayed Roman Pearce. Ja Rule, another prominent rap artist who appeared in The Fast and the Furious, was originally tapped for the role of Tej Parker. Ja Rule was offered $500,000 for the role, which was more than what he had been paid to appear in The Fast and the Furious, $15,000. According to Singleton, "Ja got too big for himself. He turned it down. He turned down a half a million dollars. ... He was acting like he was too big to be in the sequel. He wouldn't return calls." The director then hired Chris "Ludacris" Bridges as a substitute. Bridges would later rise to prominence for appearing in the film and star in later films such as Crash and Hustle & Flow. Additional cast also included Cole Hauser as key villain Carter Verone, who appeared in Singleton's Higher Learning; Eva Mendes as undercover agent Monica Fuentes; and Devon Aoki as Suki, the sole female driver in the film.

Filming
Principal photography began in the fall of 2002, and Matthew F. Leonetti served as the director of photography. Filming was done mostly in various parts of South Florida such as Miami Beach, Seven Mile Bridge, and Homestead Air Reserve Base. Hauser's character's mansion was shot in Coral Gables, in a house owned by Sylvester Stallone.

A car enthusiast himself, Walker drove a Nissan Skyline GT-R model R34 borrowed from the film's Technical Advisor, Craig Lieberman, in the film's opening scenes. Aoki did not have a driver's license or any driving experience prior to the film's production, and took driving lessons during filming; she drove a pink 2001 Honda S2000 AP1 in the film. Gibson drove a convertible Mitsubishi Eclipse Spyder, while Michael Ealy drove a Toyota Supra Turbo MkIV model JZA80 that had been used by Walker in The Fast and the Furious.

Music

The musical score was composed by David Arnold. The soundtrack was released on May 27, 2003 on Def Jam Recordings, the same record label that Ludacris was signed to.

Release

Box office
2 Fast 2 Furious earned $52.1 million in its U.S. opening in 3,408 theaters, ranking first for the weekend, taking the number #1 spot off of Finding Nemo. It went on to score the fourth-highest June opening weekend, behind Batman Forever, Scooby-Doo and Austin Powers: The Spy Who Shagged Me. In its 133 days in release, the film reached a peak release of 3,418 theaters in the U.S. and earned $127.2 million in domestically. The film had the 15th largest US gross of 2003 and the 16th largest worldwide gross of 2003; combined with the international gross of $109.2 million, the film earned $236.4 million worldwide.

Critical response

On Rotten Tomatoes, 2 Fast 2 Furious has an approval rating of 36% based on 160 reviews and an average rating of 4.75/10. The site's critical consensus reads: "Beautiful people and beautiful cars in a movie that won't tax the brain cells." On Metacritic it has a weighted average score of 38 out of 100 based on reviews from 36 critics, indicating "generally unfavorable reviews". Audiences surveyed by CinemaScore gave the film an average grade of "A−" on scale of A+ to F.

Todd McCarthy of Variety magazine wrote: "While this John Singleton-directed sequel provides a breezy enough joyride, it lacks the unassuming freshness and appealing neighborhood feel of the economy-priced original."
Scott Tobias of The A.V. Club wrote: "Singleton abandons the underground racing subculture that gave the first film its allure, relying instead on lazy thriller plotting that's only a bag of donuts and a freeze-frame away from the average TV cop show." USA Today's Mike Clark gave film 2 out of 4, and wrote "The movie is all about racing, and character be damned, though the still dazed-looking Walker and Tyrese finally get a little rapport going after a worn-out story's very rocky start." He concludes "Lack of pretension helps the viewer get over the fact that this is just another retread. " Roger Ebert of the Chicago Sun-Times gave the film 3 out of 4 and said, "It doesn't have a brain in its head, but it's made with skill and style and, boy, it is fast and furious." In 2018, Derek Lawrence of the Entertainment Weekly called it "the forgotten Fast and Furious gem" and praised the chemistry between Walker and Gibson and John Singleton's direction. In 2019, Bilge Eberi of Vulture also praised the movie especially Singleton’s direction.

In 2014, John Singleton said:“It was awesome. The heads of the studio at the time were just like, just make it fun, make it cool, make it this gen. I didn’t do all that techno music that they did in the first movie. I used nothing but Southern Hip Hop which was like the rage at the time. I just funked it up, I made it more multi-ethnic. They kind of followed the paradigm that I set up. What we’re going to do here is Paul [Walker]’s character—God bless his soul — Paul Walker is going to be edgy. He’s going to be more like a bad boy. That was the film where he was the star. That was the movie where he was the star of the picture because we didn’t have Vin [Diesel]. It was a real fun experience.“

Accolades

References

External links

 
 
 

2003 films
2003 action thriller films
2000s chase films
2003 crime thriller films
2000s heist films
2000s road movies
American action thriller films
American chase films
American crime thriller films
American heist films
American road movies
American sequel films
2000s English-language films
Fast & Furious films
Fictional portrayals of the Miami-Dade Police Department
Films about automobiles
Films directed by John Singleton
Films produced by Neal H. Moritz
Films scored by David Arnold
Films set in California
Films set in Miami
Films shot in Miami
Original Film films
Films with screenplays by Gary Scott Thompson
Universal Pictures films
2000s American films